Darren Peetoom (born 23 August 1969 in Rotherham) is a former English professional darts player who competes in the British Darts Organisation events. He has qualified for the 2016 BDO World Darts Championship.

Career
Peetoom qualified for the 1996 World Matchplay, where he lost to Jerry Umberger in the first round.
He qualified for the 2016 BDO World Darts Championship through the Hull qualifiers before losing to Kostas Pantelidis 3–2 in the Preliminary round.

World Championship results

BDO
 2016: Preliminary round (lost to Kostas Pantelidis 2–3) (sets)

References

External links
 Darren Peetoom on Darts Database

1969 births
Living people
English darts players
British Darts Organisation players
Sportspeople from Rotherham